Stygobromus balconis, the Balcones cave amphipod, is a troglomorphic species of amphipod in family Crangonyctidae. It is endemic to Texas in the United States.

The common name refers to the Balcones escarpment in central Texas.

See also
Balcones Canyonlands National Wildlife Refuge
Palaemonetes antrorum - Balcones cave shrimp

References

Freshwater crustaceans of North America
Crustaceans described in 1943
Cave crustaceans
Endemic fauna of Texas
balconis